Hopewell High School is a secondary school located in Hopewell, Virginia. Built in 1968, it is the only High School in Hopewell, Virginia. From 1925 to 1968, the high school in Hopewell was located at the Hopewell High School Complex, also known as James E. Mallonee Middle School.

Academics 
HHS ranks among the top 15,000~ high schools in America, 290~ in Virginia, and 40~ in the Richmond Metro Area. 14% of students take part in AP classes, with 1% of students passing at least 1 AP exam. The graduation rate is 80%.

Sports 
The Hopewell Blue Devils have won state titles in football and basketball. Their latest title came in 2019, in football, when the team beat Lord Botetourt high school 35–7, at Liberty University, to win the 3A state title. Hopewell also won the Division 3 state title in 2017 when the Blue Devils defeated Heritage 20-14 in Williamsburg, VA. In 2003, the team won the AAA Division 5 state championship in football. All together Hopewell has won six state championships in football (1949, 1950, 1951, 2003, 2017, and 2019).  Hopewell has also had three state champions in wrestling: Cody Allala (145, 152, 160) Clint Allala (171) and their latest champion, Alize Branch (138, 145). The boys' basketball team, though a perennial contender and frequent final four entrant, won its only state championship in 1972 under the leadership of VHSL Hall of Fame Coach Bill Littlepage. Littlepage won over 755 games in his illustrious career. The girls basketball team reached the state final in both 2017 and 2018 but was unsuccessful in both years. In 2017-2018, Hopewell was one of a few select schools in the entire state of Virginia when its girls basketball team, boys basketball team, baseball team and football team all won Region titles. In 2021, the Hopewell Boys Basketball team, under the guidance of coach Elvin Edmonds, won Hopewell's 2nd state championship by defeating Abingdon.

Classes offered
Business and Information Technology
CTE Departments 
English
Family and Consumer Science
Fine Arts 
Foreign Language (Spanish and French)
Guidance
ISAEP/GED
Marketing Education
Math
Physical Education
Science
Social Studies
JROTC
Health and Wellness
Virtual Learning

Notable alumni
TreVeyon Henderson, American football player 
Darrell Taylor, professional football player
Monsanto Pope, professional football player 
Dorothiea Hundley (aka Seka), adult film actress
Lamar Giles, American author

Some notable attendees, but not graduates, are:
Bass player Michael Bishop

References

External links
 Official website
 HHS Alumni Website

Public high schools in Virginia
Buildings and structures in Hopewell, Virginia
1915 establishments in Virginia
Educational institutions established in 1915